Mount Tom is a village in the city of Easthampton, Massachusetts, in the United States. It is located in a narrow strip of land between Mount Tom (the mountain) to the south, the Connecticut River to the east, and The Oxbow, an old channel of the Connecticut River, to the north. Interstate 91, U.S. Route 5, and Pan Am Railways' tracks all pass through the village's vicinity as they follow the Connecticut River.

References

Villages in Hampshire County, Massachusetts
Springfield metropolitan area, Massachusetts
Massachusetts populated places on the Connecticut River
Villages in Massachusetts